Led by head coach Shannon Miller, the team had 128 goals for, and 68 goals against. The Bulldogs finished the season with a record of 24 wins, 11 losses and 4 ties. Their WCHA Conference record was 19 wins, 6 losses and 3 ties. In the NCAA Championship game, the Bulldogs were defeated by WCHA rival Wisconsin Badgers.

Exhibition

Regular season

Schedule
 NC indicates Non-Conference game

Player stats

Skaters

Goaltenders

Postseason

WCHA playoffs

NCAA tournament

References

Minnesota-Duluth
NCAA women's ice hockey Frozen Four seasons
Minnesota Duluth Bulldogs women's ice hockey seasons